Edroy A. "Ed" Kringstad (March 28, 1937 – May 4, 2013) was an American educator and politician.

Kringstad was born in Fairdale, North Dakota. He was the son of Ernest O. Kringstad (1910-1970) and Alice G. (Aamot) Kringstad  (1917-2012). He graduated  from Valley City State University and received his masters from University of North Dakota. Kringstad taught at Bismarck State College and was the wrestling coach.  He was named twice  NWCA National Junior College Coach of the Year (1974 and 1986) and was inducted into the National Junior College Athletic Association Wrestling Hall of Fame in 1978. He was inducted into the Viking Hall of Fame at Valley City State (1993).

Kringstad served in the North Dakota State Senate (1995-2006) as a Republican. He died in Bismarck, North Dakota.

References

1937 births
2013 deaths
Politicians from Bismarck, North Dakota
People from Walsh County, North Dakota
Valley City State University alumni
University of North Dakota alumni
Educators from North Dakota
American wrestling coaches
Republican Party North Dakota state senators
American people of Norwegian descent
College wrestling coaches in the United States